The Bangladeshi Ambassador to the United States is the official representative of the Government of Bangladesh to the Government of the United States.

List of representatives

References 

 
United States
Bangladesh